Michelle Claire Ryan (born 22 April 1984) is an English actress. She played Zoe Slater on the BBC soap opera EastEnders (2000–2005). In 2007, she starred in the short-lived American television series Bionic Woman. She appeared as the evil sorceress Nimueh in the 2008 BBC fantasy series Merlin and as Lady Christina de Souza in the 2009 Doctor Who episode "Planet of the Dead".

Career

2000–2006: EastEnders and Cashback
A member of a local theatre group since she was 10, she was picked for her role in EastEnders when she was 16 and first appeared on the show in September 2000. She left the series in June 2005.

Ryan was given her first acting role playing Sheylla Grands in the series TV show Chosen Ones in the first season and Zoe Slater in the BBC soap EastEnders.

During summer 2005, Ryan appeared in a run of Who's the Daddy? at the King's Head Theatre. The play, by Toby Young and Lloyd Evans, is based on the David Blunkett paternity case.

Ryan had a small role in an episode of Agatha Christie's Marple which screened in February 2006, and also appeared in a small independent film the same year, Cashback.

2007–2008: Mansfield Park, Jekyll and Bionic Woman

In early 2007, Ryan was seen as Maria in Mansfield Park opposite Billie Piper for ITV and also as Lila in the film I Want Candy, co-starring Carmen Electra and Mackenzie Crook.

In February 2007, it was announced that she had been cast as the lead in the drama Bionic Woman, a remake of the 70s series. The show began airing in the United States on the broadcast network NBC in September 2007. Ryan affected an American accent for the role of Jaime Sommers, except in the episode "The Education of Jaime Sommers" in which her character goes undercover as an English transfer student at a university; for this episode, she spoke in an Oxfordshire accent instead of her natural London accent. She has had professional dance training and attributed it to helping her with the physically demanding stunts required for the show. She also learned Krav Maga and sign language for the part (the latter because, as originally conceived, Ryan's character was to have had a hearing impaired sister, but this story element was abandoned). Ryan stated the show's cancellation came about because it kept changing direction, and stated it led to her being less ambitious about her career. "I'm more go-with-the-flow now", she said.

On Red Nose Day 2007, Ryan appeared in a Mr. Bean sketch written and recorded for Comic Relief.

In May 2007, Ryan revealed she had auditioned the previous year for the role of Vesper Lynd in Casino Royale, eventually given to Eva Green. In late 2007, she appeared in Flick, a Welsh independent film co-starring Faye Dunaway and Leslie Phillips.

Prior to Bionic Woman, she appeared in Jekyll for the BBC, a modern-day version of Strange Case of Dr Jekyll and Mr Hyde starring James Nesbitt. It began its six-episode run on 16 June 2007, and was released on DVD in the United States on 18 September 2007, one week prior to her debut in Bionic Woman.

2008–2011: Merlin, Doctor Who and Mister Eleven
She has also appeared as the sorceress Nimueh in the BBC drama series Merlin, playing the role in several episodes of the show's first season.

Ryan is signed to Independent Models in London. She is a patron of children's cancer charity CLIC Sargent.

Ryan also filmed an ITV romantic drama, Mister Eleven in 2008.

In January 2009, the BBC announced that Ryan had been cast as Lady Christina de Souza in the Doctor Who special episode "Planet of the Dead", which was broadcast on 11 April 2009. She had been rumoured for a part beforehand, and is open to reprising the role in future, although "At the moment, when it comes to acting, I'm a bit of a commitment-phobe."

Ryan and Grey's Anatomy star Kevin McKidd starred in a one-off drama for BBC Scotland, One Night In Emergency, the story of one man's surreal search for his wife in an inner-city hospital. The film, which was filmed in and around Glasgow, was written by Gregory Burke, and directed by Michael Offer.

Also in 2009, Ryan filmed 4.3.2.1., a crime thriller starring Emma Roberts, Noel Clarke, Tamsin Egerton and Ophelia Lovibond.

She starred in a stage production of The Talented Mr. Ripley at the Royal Theatre in Northampton until 9 October 2010.

In October 2010, she completed filming the terrorist thriller Cleanskin. That same year, she appeared in the comedy film Huge alongside Noel Clarke, Johnny Harris, Ralph Brown, Thandiwe Newton, and Tamsin Egerton, directed by Ben Miller. Another film, No Ordinary Trifle, is in post-production. Also in 2011, Ryan played Helena from A Midsummer Night's Dream in the BBC Learning project, Off By Heart Shakespeare.

2012–present: Cockneys vs Zombies and Cabaret

Ryan also appeared in Cockneys vs Zombies, a comedy horror film about a team of bank robbers fighting the undead, directed by Matthias Hoene, alongside Georgia King, Rasmus Hardiker and Jack Doolan. The film was released in September 2012.

For the final months of 2012, Ryan toured with Will Young in a production of Cabaret. This production also played in London's West End.

In 2018, Ryan began reprising her Doctor Who role as Lady Christina in her own Big Finish Productions spinoff audio drama series.

Filmography

Television

Film

Voice work

Awards and nominations

References

External links

 

Living people
1984 births
20th-century English actresses
21st-century English actresses
Actresses from London
English child actresses
English film actresses
English soap opera actresses
English stage actresses
English television actresses
People educated at Chace Community School
People from Enfield, London